Briarhurst Manor, also known as William A. Bell House, is a finely grained pink Victorian sandstone manor house listed on the National Register of Historic Places in the city of Manitou Springs, Colorado. It is the second building on this site.

Construction of the original Briarhurst began in 1872. Dr. William Bell, the home's owner, left for England to marry a woman named Cara, who agreed to live with Bell in Colorado as long as her children were born in England. The Tudor Revival style home was added to the National Register of Historic Places in 1973. Fountain Creek passes through the estate and the home is in the shadow of Pikes Peak.

Under Mrs. Cara Bell's direction, Briarhurst became "the social center" of the community, hosting the internationally famous of the day, President Grant, President Teddy Roosevelt and Oscar Wilde after his lecture in Colorado Springs in 1882. On occasion, a tribe of friendly Utes camped on the Briarhurst estate grounds while preparing to go into the Garden of the Gods, for them a holy place of worship.

One winter night in 1886, while Dr. Bell was away on business, Mrs. Bell awoke to a bedroom filled with smoke. Burning embers escaped from a fireplace in Briarhurst. She woke the children and servants. Cara stayed in the burning house and with the help of gardener Schneider, they rescued a prized oil painting by Thomas Moran, the "Mount of the Holy Cross". The family escaped safely, but lost all of their belongings and returned to England. They returned in early 1887 to begin reconstruction of a second, more elaborate Briarhurst Manor, complete with schoolroom, conservatory, cloister and a library with a special alcove to display the "Mount of the Holy Cross."

Today,  of the original Briarhurst estate is a restaurant and event venue.  The restaurant seats over 400 guests and features Colorado cuisine. About 2 acres of the old estate is used for a large warehouse building and the Blue Skies Inn Bed and Breakfast utilizing the original 1873 carriage house and 4 other buildings. Hundreds of weddings and receptions are celebrated in the Briarhurst gardens created by Dr Bell's gardener Ferdinand Schneider over a hundred years ago.

See also
National Register of Historic Places listings in El Paso County, Colorado

References

External links
Briarhurst (official site)
Haunted Briarhurst
Image of the original Briarhurst and the visit by Oscar Wilde)

Houses on the National Register of Historic Places in Colorado
Gothic Revival architecture in Colorado
Houses completed in 1888
Manitou Springs, Colorado
Houses in El Paso County, Colorado
Tourist attractions in El Paso County, Colorado
National Register of Historic Places in El Paso County, Colorado
1888 establishments in Colorado